In Exile Deo is the sixth album by Juliana Hatfield, released in 2004.

Track listing

Personnel
 Juliana Hatfield – vocals, guitar
 Peter Adams – keyboards
 Jill Kurtz – harmonica
 Josh Lattanzi – bass guitar, background vocals
 Rob Turner – cello
 Larry Packer – violin
 Damon Richardson – drums
 Steve Scully – drums

Production
Producers: Juliana Hatfield, David Leonard
Engineers: Brian Brown, Dave Cook, Tom Dube
Mixing: David Leonard, Dave Way
Mastering: Greg Calbi
String arrangements: Gary Burke

References

Juliana Hatfield albums
2004 albums
Zoë Records albums
Albums produced by David Leonard (record producer)